Glenroy railway station is located on the Craigieburn line in Victoria, Australia. It serves the northern Melbourne suburb of Glenroy, and opened on 24 January 1887.

History

Glenroy station opened on 24 January 1887, with the railway line past the site of the station opening in 1872, as part of the North East line to School House Lane. Like the suburb itself, the station is named after a pastoral run occupied by Duncan Cameron, who originated from Glen Roy, Scotland.

In 1908, a goods siding was provided and, in 1950, it was extended to a nearby flour mill. Hand gates protected the former Glenroy Road level crossing until 1957, when boom barriers were provided. In 1965, the double line block signalling between Broadmeadows and Essendon was abolished, and replaced with three-position signalling. All mechanical interlocking at the station was also abolished, and a signal panel was provided.

On 14 September 1973, Tait motor carriage 424M was destroyed by fire at the station.

The original station buildings were provided in 1886 and, in 1976, were replaced with brick structures. In 1987, the signal panel was abolished.

In 1999, Glenroy was upgraded to a Premium Station.

The station was rebuilt for a second time by the Level Crossing Removal Project, due to the grade separation of the Glenroy Road level crossing. On 2 July 2019, it was announced that the level crossing would be removed by lowering the railway line underneath Glenroy Road, and would include a rebuilt station. On 11 October 2020, designs for the new station were released. Major construction began soon after and, on 6 May 2022, the rebuilt station opened.

Platforms and services
Glenroy has two side platforms. It is served by Craigieburn line trains.

Platform 1:
  all stations services to Flinders Street

Platform 2:
  all stations services to Craigieburn

Travel links
Dysons operates five bus routes via Glenroy station, under contract to Public Transport Victoria:
 : to Eltham station (via Lower Plenty)
 : to Eltham station (via Greensborough)
 : to Coburg
 : to Gowrie station
 : Roxburgh Park station – Pascoe Vale station

Ventura Bus Lines operates one bus route to and from Glenroy station, under contract to Public Transport Victoria:
  : to Brunswick station (Saturday and Sunday mornings only)

Gallery

References

External links
 Melway map at street-directory.com.au

Premium Melbourne railway stations
Railway stations in Melbourne
Railway stations in Australia opened in 1887
Railway stations in the City of Merri-bek